The Citizens Bank of Lafourche, also known as the Citizens Finance Corporate Building, is a historic commercial building located at 413 West 4th Street in Thibodaux, Louisiana.

Built in 1910, the building is a single story brick commercial building in Beux-Arts style. The hall is surmounted by a rectangular domical vault with a stained glass lantern. A second story has been added to one of the side wings, without affecting the overall architectural significance.

The building was listed on the National Register of Historic Places on March 5, 1986.

It is one of 14 individually NRHP-listed properties in the "Thibodaux Multiple Resource Area", which also includes:
Bank of Lafourche Building
Breaux House
Building at 108 Green Street
Chanticleer Gift Shop

Grand Theatre
Lamartina Building
McCulla House
Peltier House
Percy-Lobdell Building
Riviere Building
Riviere House
Robichaux House
St. Joseph Co-Cathedral and Rectory

See also
 National Register of Historic Places listings in Lafourche Parish, Louisiana

References

Bank buildings on the National Register of Historic Places in Louisiana
Beaux-Arts architecture in Louisiana
Commercial buildings completed in 1910
Lafourche Parish, Louisiana
National Register of Historic Places in Lafourche Parish, Louisiana